Munich Markets (German: Markthallen München) is the name of the merged municipal company, which includes the Wholesale Market Munich and the Munich Slaughterhouse. The premises are situated in the Munich Sendling and Ludwigsvorstadt districts.

History 
The idea to merge these two adjoining municipal companies existed for a long time. On 1 December  the city council decided about the merger, which became effective on 1 January 2007.

Company 
The Munich Markets includes:
 Wholesale Market Munich
 Munich Slaughterhouse
 Elisabethmarkt
 Weekly Markets in Munich
 Pasing Viktualienmarkt
 Viktualienmarkt
 Wiener Markt

External links 
 Munich Markets
 Munich Markets (in German)

Retail markets in Munich
Buildings and structures in Munich